Harvey Averne (born 1936, Brooklyn, New York) has been described as "one of several prominent Jewish Americans in New York's bustling Latin music scene."

Introduction
Harvey Averne is an American record producer, and the founder of CoCo Records, as well as its many subsidiaries. Established in 1972, CoCo was a label specializing in Afro-Cuban and Latin American Popular music, with special emphasis on the "New York Sound", commonly referred to as "Salsa". Averne's gift for identifying and bringing together new and established musical talent, along with the careful management of his artists' public image, initially made CoCo Records a major label nationally, and subsequently an international success. Over the next decade, he signed internationally known artists and was instrumental in bringing Latin American music into the American cultural mainstream.

In 1972 Averne signed the iconic artist Eddie Palmieri to his label, producing and mixing two of Palmieri's groundbreaking albums; "Sentido" and "Sun Of Latin Music". These recordings were considered radical departures from the type of dance oriented music that had prevailed during the previous two decades. The latter album earned Palmieri, Averne and CoCo the first Grammy ever awarded to an artist in the newly created "Latin Music" category (1975).

The following year (1976), Averne produced and mixed a third Eddie Palmieri album ("Unfinished Masterpiece"), which also won the coveted Grammy award. In addition, he achieved major successes in 1977 with two Grammy nominations for his productions of the Danny Rivera and Eydie Gorme hit "Para Decir Adios" (from the album "Muy Amigos") and The Machito Orchestra with Lalo Rodriguez ("Fireworks"). Both albums were included among the final five nominees.

In subsequent years, various artists who were signed to the CoCo family of labels also won numerous awards and nominations. The list includes such notables as Lissette Alvarez, Wilkins, Mario Bauza and Graciela, Yolandita Monge, Steve Lawrence, Trini Lopez, Rafael Cortijo, Ismael Rivera, Jose Fajardo, Charlie Palmieri, Joe Quijano and Orquesta Broadway, among others. The diversity of the CoCo catalogue actually brought a wider awareness of traditional Latin music to a new generation.

Early life
By the time Averne was fourteen he was a professional musician. During the mid 1950s through the 1970s he appeared in hundreds of reviews and shows, at such popular New York venues as the Boulevard Night Club (Queens), The Palladium Ballroom, Lincoln Center, The Village Gate, Jules Podell's Copacabana, Roseland Ballroom, Harlem's Apollo Theater, The Cotton Club, Carnegie Hall, Basin Street East, The Cheetah and The New York Academy Of Music, as well as Chicago's Aragon Ballroom, Coliseo Roberto Clemente in Puerto Rico and the famed Hollywood Palladium. He found steady work and much inspiration during these years, appearing with such notables as Don Rickles, Tom Jones, Tony Bennett, Harry Belafonte, James Brown, Jerry Butler, The O'Jays, Richard Pryor, The Main Ingredient, Grover Washington Jr, Al Green, and Frankie Crocker, among others. In addition to the New York cabaret and club circuit, he performed with his own band "Arvito & His Latin Rhythms" in the Catskill Mountain Resort Area (also known as the Borscht Belt, or the Jewish Alps), a popular vacation spot for New Yorkers since the 1920s. He worked there from 1950 through 1963, as well as in Long Island's Lido Beach and Long Beach, a strip which was known for its private beach clubs and hotels. He brought his fiery dance rhythms into the Malibu Beach Club, Colony Beach Club, The Coral Reef, The Monaco, The Sands and The Shelbourne. These venues drew thousands of day-tripper/ members who arrived early to enjoy their cabanas, beaches, pools and tennis courts. Later in the evening, the patrons would dress up elegantly for dinner in the restaurants and take in star-studded shows in the nightclubs. The aforementioned clubs offered such big-name performers as Steve Lawrence and Eydie Gorme, Jackie Mason, Mal Z. Lawrence, Al Martino, Buddy Hackett, Hines, Hines and Dad; as well as the popular Latin bands of Tito Puente, Machito, Tito Rodriguez, Eddie Palmieri, Larry Harlow, Joe Cuba, La Playa Sextet and of course Arvito & His Latin Rhythms. All of these stars performed regularly at both the beach clubs and the Catskill resort hotels. Curiously, it was amidst all of this showbiz glitz that Harvey's love for Latin American music and culture further manifested itself.

Recording career

A prolific songwriter in his own right (over fifty of his songs have been recorded), Averne wrote most of the material for his newly formed group "The Harvey Averne Dozen". Their album "Viva Soul", for Atlantic Records included the top selling hit "My Dream" as well as the often recorded and sampled "You're No Good", both of which are Averne-Sheller compositions. A second album for the Fania label, the self-titled "Harvey Averne Dozen" included Averne compositions "Accept Me", "Can You Dig It" and the international dance hit "Never Learned to Dance". It also included the movie theme "Lullaby from Rosemary's Baby" (Harvey's recording was subsequently sampled by Big Daddy Kane on his track "Rest In Peace"). He changed the name of the group to "The Harvey Averne Band" for the Fania release "Brotherhood" (1970). This album included various Latin crossover hits such as "Lovers", "Come Back Baby", "Come On And Do Me" and the pop hit "Central Park". Around this time he began reinvesting his songwriting success into producing, and after years of hard work as a musician he was able to make the transition.

Producing Career and Coco Records

In addition to his involvement with the Fania label, Averne had other equally important projects that were also well received. In 1969 he produced, directed and mixed "The Queen Does Her Own Thing" for the extremely popular Cuban artist La Lupe. The album was released on Roulette/Tico Records and included the hit single "Se Acabo" (Once We Loved). In addition, he produced and mixed "The Harvey Averne Barrio Band" and "Toro" albums, for Heavy Duty/Fania Records. During his tenure at Fania he either produced or supervised recordings by Ray Barretto, Willie Colon, Orquesta Harlow, Hector Lavoe, Ismael Miranda, Bobby Valentin, Mongo Santamaria, Johnny Pacheco, Roberto Roena, Joe Bataan, Ralfi Pagan, The Latineers and George Guzman, among others. While maintaining a managerial position as vice president, Averne was still signed to the label as a recording artist and producer (a rarity back then), and freelanced on various productions for Scepter/Wand, Heavy Duty, Uptite and Atlantic Records as well. He was later named Executive Vice President of Fania's new subsidiary Vaya Records. At Vaya he worked closely with such artists as Celia Cruz, Cheo Feliciano, Ricardo Ray and Bobby Cruz, Bobby Rodriguez y La Compañia and Markolino Diamond (which featured Angel Canales's singing debut). Averne ran the Vaya label through 1971, and was responsible for all administrative functions and production. 
 
In 1971 an obscure studio band known as The Chakachas recorded the hit single "Jungle Fever," of which Averne became the band leader. This recording sold more than two million copies and won the ASCAP Award as one of the most performed songs of the year in their catalogue. Averne also produced the crossover hit gold record "I Want To Make It With You" for the artist Ralfi Pagan (Scepter/ Wand/Fania) and was appointed General Manager and Executive Vice President of United Artists' Latin Music Division (UA Latino). There, he not only signed artists but established new distribution outlets and brought promotional techniques to the label that were innovative. These were the label's most profitable years, with such international Latin stars as Raphael, Tito Rodriguez, Nelson Ned, Ismael Quintana, Morris Albert ("Feelings"), Chucho Avellanet, Martinha, Mocedades, Astor Piazzola and Jose Trellis all forming part of its huge roster. "The Harvey Averne Group" also recorded "Let's Get It Together You and Me" for United Artists Records.

Harvey Averne remained active as vice president and general manager of UA Latino until 1972, when he decided to create his own label, CoCo Records. By 1977 his company had gained international prominence, due to a license agreement with Spain's Zafiro Records. CoCo acquired Zafiro's catalogue for distribution in the US, which also included some Latin American territories. The roster of stars on the Zafiro label included Juan Carlos Calderon, Basilio, Juan Bau, Mocedades ("Eres Tu"), Astor Piazzola and Joan Manuel Serrat, among others. In exchange, CoCo was distributed exclusively in Spain by Zafiro. In 1979 Averne partnered with Lenny Fitchelberg and Sam Goff, forming Prism Records. The Prism label specialized in Disco dance music (a genre that peaked in popularity during the late 1970s), releasing such top ten hits as the Erotic Drum Band's "Plug Me To Death" and "Not Too Young" by Alfonso "The Tap Dance Kid" by Ribeiro. In addition, he produced and re-mixed Regine's International Hit "Je Survivrai" (I Will Survive) and a disco version of Eric Clapton's "Cocaine" by Chi-Chi Favelas.

Life after Coco

Although CoCo continued to produce major hits throughout the 1970s, there were numerous financial problems and by the advent of the 1980s the record company was no longer the major force it had previously been. Averne had already relocated to France and Belgium in 1979 to work on Euro-Disco productions for Aquarius-Unidans Records, working with Jean Claude Pellerin & Jean Van Loo in production of tracks for various artists, including Patrick Hernandez, whose hit "Born To Be Alive" sold more than six million copies worldwide. While in Europe, Averne negotiated a license agreement between Aquarius/Unidans and CBS/Atomic Records for U.S.A. distribution. He also discovered Madonna and presented her to Aquarius/Unidans Records. The fledgling singer was hired as back-up dancer for Patrick Hernandez for his live shows and tours and was subsequently signed to her first recording contract with Aquarius/Unidans. After 1979, Averne divested his interests from his various labels and retired from the music and record business. When gambling was legalized in Atlantic City he went into the real estate and time share business there, later branching out into the state of Florida. During this time he continued to reside in New York's Upper East Side, where he lived from 1963 to 2004.

Averne has made a bit of a comeback in recent years, re-appearing on the Latin music scene in New York City. In particular, he worked with New York-based boogaloo revival band Spanglish Fly, led by Jonathan Goldman, to produce two of their tracks, "Brooklyn Boogaloo" and "My Shingaling Boy."

Sampling

In 1993 the pioneer rapper Big Daddy Kane sampled Averne's "Lullaby from Rosemary's Baby" for the track "Rest In Peace" and released it in the Cold Chillin/Warner Bros/ Reprise album "Looks Like a Job For....". In 1967, American minimalist composer Terry Riley got his hands on the song "You're No Good", a Latin-soul-boogaloo type number that had been previously released by Averne that same year. Upon hearing Averne's original track, Riley went into the studio, sampled it and created what soon became one of his all-time classic tracks (Riley's version is a great tune in its own right and is credited as "the world's first remix").
His band's Beatles cover of "I feel fine" is used by Tom Caruana in his mashup album "Enter the Magical Mystery Chambers"(2010), in which he puts Wu-Tang vocals to Beatles songs.

Miguelito Documentary
A documentary film was made by Australian filmmaker Sam Zubrycki about Averne's 1973 CoCo Records production entitled 'Miguelito: Canto a Borinquen.' Told by the fans and people that knew of and loved his music,  'Miguelito: Canto a Borinquen' is a film that goes on a journey that traces the mysterious disappearance of the eleven year old Puerto Rican salsa singer Miguelito and the rediscovery of his life and music decades later.

It was released on 7 March 2019.

Harvey Averne discography

1967 The Harvey Averne Dozen 
"VIVA SOUL" Atlantic Records

1967 La Lupe 
"THE QUEEN DOES HER OWN THING" Tico/Roulete Records

1967 Larry Harlow "EL EXIGENTE" 
featuring Ismael Miranda Fania Records

1967 Polito Vega "CANTA PARA TI" 
Producers: Johnny Pacheco/Harvey AverneFania Records

1967 Terry Riley "THE WORLD'S FIRST REMIX" Sampled the Harvey Averne Dozen track "You're No Good" from "Viva Soul" 
Atlantic Records and is credited with "The World's First Remix"

1968 Ray Barretto "ACID" Fania Records

1968 George Guzman "INTRODUCING GEORGE GUZMAN" Fania Records

1968 Latinaires "CAMEL WALK" Fania Records

1969 The Harvey Averne Dozen  "THE HARVEY AVERNE DOZEN" Fania Records

1970 Joan Manuel Serrat "MI NIÑEZ" Zafiro/CoCo Records

1970 The Harvey Averne Band "BROTHERHOOD" Fania Records

1971 Harvey Averne Barrio Band "ROCK 'N LATIN" Heavy Duty/Fania Records

1971 Ralfi Pagan "I WANT TO MAKE IT WITH YOU" Scepter/Wand/Fania Records

1971 Markolino Dimond "BRUJERIA" Vocals: Angel CanalesVaya/Fania Records

1971 Nelson Ned "CANCION POPULAR" United Artists Latino (1st Spanish Album)

1971 Martina "MARTINA" United Artists Latino (1st Spanish Album)

1971 Chakachas "JUNGLE FEVER" Polydor Records

1971 Vicentico Valdes  "AMOR Y FELICIDAD" United Artists Latino

1971 Tito Rodriguez "RETURNS TO THE PALLADIUM LIVE" United Artists Latino

1971 Javier Oliva "SENTIMIENTO" Volume No.1 United Artists Latino

1971 Tito Rodriguez "TITO RODRIQUEZ AND HIS ORCHESTRA" United Artists Latino

1972 Massiel "LO MEJOR DE MASSIEL" Zafiro/CoCo Records

1972 Mocedades "EXITOS DE ORO" Zafiro/CoCo Records

1972 Toro (Latin Rock) "TORO" Heavy Duty/Fania Records

1972 Nelson Feliciano "NELSON FELICIANO" Vocals: Junior Cordova Mango/CoCo Records

1972 Orchestra Dee Jay  "ORCHESTRA DEE JAY" Vocals: Rafael de Jesus Mango/CoCo Records

1973 Paul Ortiz y La Orquesta Son "MEREMBE" Mango/CoCo Records

1973 Eddie Palmieri "SENTIDO" Vocals: Ismael Quintana Mango/CoCo Records

1973 Nelson Feliciano / Kito Velez "NELSON FELICIANO" Vocals: Joe P. CoCo Records

1973 Miguelito "CANTO A BORIÑQUEN" CoCo Records

1973 Toro (Latin Rock) "TORO" CoCo Records

1973 Eddie Palmieri & Friends "LIVE IN CONCERT AT THE UNIVERSITY OF PUERTO RICO" Vocals: Ismael Quintana Guest: Charlie Palmieri (Organ) 
CoCo Records

1973 Les Chakachas (Jungle Fever) "TIBIDIBANG" Biram Records

1974 Juan Bau "PENAS" Zafiro/CoCo Records

1974 Orquesta La Corporacion Latina "EL ORGULLO DE PUERTO RICO" Lamp/CoCo Records

1974 Cortijo "CORTIJO Y SU MAQUINA DEL TIEMPO" (CORTIJO & HIS TIME MACHINE)CoCo Records

1974 Cesta All Stars "LIVE JAM SESSION" Featuring: Charlie Palmieri, Cheo Feliciano, Joe Quijano, Kako, Yayo El Indio, Louie Ramirez and many more CoCo Records

1974 Charlie Palmieri "ELECTRO DURO" Vocal: Victor VelaquezCoCo Records

1974 Joe Quijano (2 record set) "UN REGALO DE SALSA EN NAVIDAD" Featuring Tito Puente, Charley Palmieri, Cheo Feliciano, Cortijo, Fajardo, Cachao, Vitin Aviles and many moreCoCo Records

1974 Cortijo y Su Combo Original "JUNTOS OTRA VEZ" Con ISMAEL RIVERAHistoric Live Concert and Recording with The Original Combo, including Rafael Ithier, Roberto Roena, Roy Rosario, Sammy Ayala, Eddie Perez, Martin Quiñones, Kito Velez, Mario Cora, Miguel Cruz, Hector Santos and Andy Montañez. Presented, produced, directed & mixed Harvey Averne CoCo Records

1975 Eddie Palmieri "THE SUN OF LATIN MUSIC" Vocal: Lalo RodriguezCoCo Records

1975 Mocedades "LA OTRA ESPAÑA" Zafiro/CoCo Records

1975 Joe Quijano y Su Orquesta "AHORA" CoCo Records

1975 Jose Fajardo "FAJARDO Y SUS ESTRELLAS DEL '75" CoCo Records

1975 Charlie Palmieri "IMPULSOS" (IMPULSES) Vocal: Victor Velaquez CoCo Records

1975 Orquesta Broadway "SALVAJE" (SAVAGE)CoCo Records

1975 Eddie Palmieri "UNFINISHED MAS- TERPIECE" Vocal: Lalo RodriguezCoCo Records

1975 Joe Quijano "EXITOS DE ORO" (GOLDEN HITS)CoCo Records

1975 Yolandita Monge "FLORECIENDO" CoCo Records

1976 Harvey Averne Barrio Band "ROCK 'N LATIN" CoCo Records

1976 Eddie Palmieri "UNFINISHED MASTERPIECE" Vocal: Lalo Rodri- guezPhilips Records (Japan)

1976 Cortijo y Su Nuevo Combo "CHAMPIONS" Vocals: Fe Cortijo and Che DelgadoCoCo Records

1976 Noraida y Los Morés "LA BARBARA" CoCo Records

1976 Jose Fajardo "LA RAIZ DE LA CHARANGA" (CHARANGA ROOTS) CoCo Records

1976 Cesta All Stars "SALSA FESTIVAL" CoCo Records

1976 Orquesta Broadway "PASAPORTE" CoCo Records

1976 Yolandita Monge "REFLEXIONES" CoCo Records

1976 Cortijo "CORTIJO YSU MAQUINA DEL TIEMPO" ( CORTIJO & HIS TIME MACHINE) Philips Records/Japan

1976 Eddie Palmieri "SPOTLIGHT ON EDDIE PALMIERI" Philips Records (Japan - Licensed)

1976 Eydie Gorme "LA GORME" Gala/CoCo Records

1976 Danny Rivera "ALBORADA" Graffit/CoCo Records

1976 Alberto Carrion "PAJAROS MARINOS" Graffiti/CoCo Records

1976 Sergio y Estibaliz "QUIEN COMPRA UNA CANCION" Zafiro/CoCo Records

1976 Marisol "HABLAME DEL MAR MARINERO" Zafiro/CoCo Records

1976 Paco Martin "AÑORANZAS" Zafiro/CoCo Records

1976 Juan Bau "FANTASIA" Zafiro/CoCo Records

1976 Mocedades "EL COLOR DE TU MIRADA" Zafiro/CoCo Records

1976 Jarcha "LIBERTAD SIN IRA" Zafiro/CoCo Records

1977 Cortijo Y Su Combo "CABAL- LO DE HIERRO" Vocal: Fe Cortijo CoCo Records

1977 Machito Orchestra "FIRE- WORKS" Con Lalo Rodriquez CoCo Records

1977 Charlie Palmieri "EL GIGAN- TE Y SU ORQUESTA COLOSAL" Vocal: Victor VelasquezCoCo Records

1977 Eddie Palmieri "1973-1976 GOLD" Vocals: Lalo Rodriguez & Ismael Quintana CoCo Records

1977 Raffy Diaz "RAFFY DIAZ Y SU ORQUESTA" CoCo Records

1977 Graciela y Mario Bauza "LA BOTANICA" Lamp/CoCo Records

1977 Orquesta Cimarron "ERUPCION" Lamp/CoCo Records

1977 Yolandita Monge "SOY ANTE TODO MUJER" CoCo Records

1977 Orquesta Broadway "NEW YORK CITY SALSA" CoCo Records

1977 Jose Fajardo "SELECIONES CLASICAS" CoCo Records

1977 Steve Lawrence "TU SERAS MI MUSICA" Gala/CoCo Records

1977 Eydie Gorme & Danny Rivera "MUY AMIGOS" (Mega Hit "Para Decir Adios") Gala/CoCo Records

1977 Trini Lopez "TRINI LOPEZ Y SU ALMA LATINA" Gala/CoCo Records

1977 Danny Rivera "PARA TODA LA VIDA" Graffiti/CoCo Records

1977 Alberto Carrion "BORIÑQUEN" Graffiti/CoCo Records

1977 Mocedades "8" Zafiro/CoCo Records

1977 Basilio "DEMASIADO AMOR" Zafiro/CoCo Records

1977 Juan Bau "5" Zafiro/CoCo Records

1977 Danny Rivera "SERENATA" Graffiti/CoCo Records

1977 Orquesta Tipica Ideal "FUERA DEL MUNDO" (Out Of This World) Canta Victor Velasquez CoCo Records

1977 Lalo Rodriguez "ME LLA- MAN LALO" (They Call Me Lalo) CoCo Records

1977 Orquesta La Corporacion Latin "TRULLANDO CON LA CORPORACION LATINA" CoCo Records

1977 Los Andinos "LA NUEVA IMAGEN DE LOS ANDINOS" CoCo Records

1977 Wilkins "AMARSE UN POCO" CoCo Records

1977 Los Andinos "YO QUIERO SER TU AMANTE" CoCo Records

1977 Lissette Alvarez "SOLA" Mega Hit "COPACABANA" CoCo Records

1977 Harvey Averne Presenta "BOLEROS DEL AMOR" Featuring: Eddie Palmieri, Orchestra Broadway, Orq. La Corpo- racion Latina, Charlie Palmieri, Cheo Feliciano, Machito, Cortijo, Cesta All Stars, Lalo Rodriguez, Ismael Quintana, Graciela Y Mario Bauza, Fe Cortijo, Joe Quijano, Raffy Diaz, Victor Velaquez, Willie Torres, Felo Barrios. CoCo Records

1977 Eddie Palmieri "EXPLORATION" CoCo Records

1977 La Controversia "VISION DIVINA" CoCo Records

1978 Various Artists "BORIÑQUEN" CoCo Records

1978 Astor Piazzola /Jose Trellis "BALADA PARA UN LOCO" Zafiro/CoCo Records

1978 Jose Fajardo "EL TALENTO TOTAL" CoCo Records

1978 Orquesta Broadway "NEW YORK CITY SALSA" CoCo Records

1978 Various Artists "SALSA DISCO FEVER" Featuring: Eddie Palmieri, Puerto Rico All Stars, Andy Montañez, Cortijo y Su Combo Original con Ismael Rivera, Orquesta Broadway, Fe Cortijo, Cesta All Stars featuring Charley Palmieri, Machito, Jose Fajardo, Lalo Rodriguez, Graciela y Mario and Raffy Diaz. CoCo Records

1978 Yolandita Monge "EN SU INTIMIDAD" CoCo Records

1978 Yolandita Monge "CIERA LOS OJOS Y JUNTOS RECORDEMOS" CoCo Records

1978 Lalo Rodriguez "EVOLUCION" CoCo Records

1978 Eddie Palmieri "TIMELESS" CoCo Records

1978 Ismael Rivera "SONERO NUMERO UNO" CoCo Records

1978 Sergio y Estibaliz "CANCIONES SUDAMERICANAS" Zafiro/CoCo Records

1978 Juan Bau "CON MIS CINCOS SENTIDOS" Zafiro/CoCo Records

1978 Hernaldo "CANCIONERO" Zafiro/CoCo Records

1978 Alejandro Jaen "MIS PROPIOS SENTIMIENTOS" Zafiro/CoCo Records

1978 Don Francisco y Jose Luis "DON FRANCISCO Y JOSE LUIS" Zafiro/CoCo Records

1979 Alfonso Ribeiro "NOT TOO YOUNG" Prism Records

1979 Various Artists "CHARANGA AFTER HOURS" Jose Fajardo, Orq. Broadway, Tipica Ideal. Coco Records

1979 Regine "JE SURVRIVE" (I Will Survive) Prism Records

1995 Lalo Rodriguez "NACI PARA CANTAR" EMI Latino Records

1998 Various Artists "NUYORICAN ROOTS" Tito Puente, Arsenio Rodriguez, Tito Rodriguez, Eddie Palmieri, Ray Barretto, Machito, Harlow, Mongo Santamaria, Joe Cuba & Harvey Averne. Soul Jazz Records

2000 Various Artists "SWEET SIDE OF LATIN SOUL" Lebron Brothers, Azuqita, Orch Dee Jay, Ralfi Pagan & Harvey Averne. Latin Soul Records

2000 Terry Riley "THE WORLD"S FIRST REMIX"  Sampled the Harvey Averne Dozen track "You're No Good" from "Viva Soul", Atlantic Records. Originally released in 1967 & credited as "The World's First Remix", Re-Released 2000. Cortical Foundation

2003 Various Artists "HIDDEN TREASURES" Celia Cruz, Tito Puente, Ricardo Ray & Bobby Cruz, Orch. Broadway, the Latinaires, Joe Bataan, New Swing Sextette, Alfredito, Johnny Rivera, Ralph Robles & Harvey Averne. Fania Records

2005 Eddie Palmieri "EL PRODIGIOSO, LOS 50 AÑOS DEL MAESTRO" All Music Produced & Mixed By Harvey Averne, Compilation Produced by Richie Viera 
MP/J&N Records

2005 Various Artist "EXPLOSIVOS" Tito Puente, Charley & Eddie Palmieri, Joe Cuba, Bobby Valentine, Jimmy Sabater, Joey Pastrana, Monguito Santamaria, Alfredito, George Guzman, Chacon, King Nando & Harvey Averne. Vampi Soul Records

2007 Various Artists "NEW YORK LATIN HUSTLE, THE SOUND OF NEW YORK" Tito Puente, Eddie Palmieri, Ray Barretto, Willy Colon, Cor- tijo, Joe Cuba, Al Escobar, Machito, Candido, Seguida, Jose Mangual, La Charanga 76, Louie Ramirez, Ismael Quinones & Harvey Averne. 
Soul Jazz Records

2007 Various Artists "A SALSA TRIBUTE TO THE BEATLES" Tito Puente, La Lupe, Santitos Colon, Larry Harlow, Ricardo Ray & Bobby Cruz, Joe Bataan, Joey Pastrana, Orquesta Novel, Ralfi Pagan, L.T.G. Exchange & Harvey Averne. Universal Records

2008 Import CD Various Artists "DANCE THE LATIN, SOUL, FUNK, JAZZ!" Noro Morales, Eddie Palmieri & Cal Jader, Tito Puente, Ray Barretto, Mongo Santamaria, La Lupe, Harvey Averne, Joe Bataan, Bobby Valentine, Mauricio Smith, George Guzman, Pete Rodriguez, Chollo, Al Escobar & The Latineers. Jazzman 019 Import CD

2008 Various Artists "EL BARRIO, BACK ON THE STREETS OF SPANISH HARLEM" Fania All Stars, Tito Puente, Ray Barretto, Willie Colon, Roberto Roena, Johnny Colon, Lebron Bros. Bobby Marin, Ralfi Pagan, Joey Pastrana, Tony Middleton, Bobby Matos & Harvey Averne. Fania/Emusica Records

2008 Various Artists "EL BARRIO LATIN FUNK/NUYORICAN FUNK" Fania All Stars, Ray Barretto, Mongo Santamaria, Joe Bataan, Jimmy Sabater, TNT Boys, Monguito Santamaria, Ralfi Pagan, Azuquita, Cafe, Chollo Rivera, Seguida, & Harvey Averne. Universal/Fania/Emusica Records

2009 Harvey Averne "THE HARVEY AVERNE ANTHOLOGY/NEVER LEARNED TO DANCE 1967-71" Fania/Emusica/Codigo

2011 About Group "YOU'RE NO GOOD" Sampled the Harvey Averne Dozen track & composition "Your No Good" from "Viva Soul", Atlantic Records. The 10:00 minute First Single from their 2011 Album "Start & Complete" is a tribute to the Historic Terry Riley 1967 "World's First Re-Mix" & Sample of Harvey Averne's track "You're No Good". Domino Records

2011 Various Artists "EL BARRIO" BOOGALOO, DISCO, FUNK & SOUL" THE ULTIMATE LATIN MUSIC COLLECTION" (4 CD BOX SET) Fania All Stars, Tito Puente, La Lupe, Eddie Palmieri, Johnny Ventura, Ray Barretto, Willie Colon, Harlow, Mongo Santamaria, Joe Cuba, Ralfi Pagan, Joe Bataan, Chollo Rivera, Jimmy Sabater, Azuquita, Orquesta Novel, Gilberto Cruz, Louie Ramirez, Fausto Rey, Lou Perez, Cafe, Ralph Robles, Vladimir, Bobby Valentin, Lennie Sesar, T&T Boys, New Swing Sextette, Pete Bonet, Roberto Roena, Johnny Colon, Ray Rodriguez, The Latinaires, Pete Rodriguez, King Nando, Joey Pastrana, George Guzman, Monguito Santamaria & Harvey Averne. Fania/Emusica Records

2012 Spanglish Fly, a well known New York Boogaloo Band. Hit Record "Brooklyn Boogaloo" & "My Shingaling Boy" Produced, Mixed and Directed by Harvey Averne;

2012: Chico Alvarez (El Montunero) & The Palmonte Afro-Cuban Big Band • "Country Roots/Urban Masters". Produced By Chico Alvarez and Jerry Lacay. Album Project Consultant: Harvey Averne. Mixed by Harvey Averne, Chico Alvarez and Kamilo Kratc.

2012 Various Artists "GLASS ONION, SONGS OF THE BEATLES". Aretha Franklin, Ella Fitzgerald, Little Richard, Bill Cosby, Carmen McRae, Shirley Scott, Eddie Cano & Nino Tempo, King Curtis, Arif Mardin, Herbie Mann & Tamico Jones, The Harvey Averne Dozen & others. From the Vaults of Warner Music Group & Atlantic Records.

2013 HBO Series "EASTBOUND & DOWN". Final Season Four, Chapter 28, Utilized The Harvey Averne Band Original Song & Track Sync "LET'S GET IT TOGETHER THIS CHRISTMAS" Composed by Harvey Averne, Publisher Whistle Music BMI

2014 Various Artists "THE 60s VOLUME ONE" The Fania All Stars, Ray Barretto, Willie Colon, Johnny Pacheco & Monguito, Larry Harlow, Bobby Valentine, Louie Ramirez, Joe Bataan and Harvey AverneFania/Codigo Records.

2014 "BARRALOADASOUL" A Documentary Filmed at The Glasgow Barrowland Ballroom Scotland. Featured track sync "NEVER LEARNED TO DANCE" by The Harvey Averne Band, composed by Harvey Averne, Publisher Whistle Music BMI

2014 VARIOUS ARTISTS "THE 60s VOLUME FIVE" Eddie Palmieri, Ray Barretto, Joe Cuba, Willie Colon, Hector Lavoe, Johnny Pacheco, Machito Y Graciela, Bobby Valentin, Joe Bataan, Ralfi Pagan, Latin Blues Band, Johnny Colon, Lebron Brothers, Jimmy Sabater and The Harvey Averne DozenFania/Codigo Records

References

1936 births
American accordionists
American company founders
Record producers from New York (state)
Businesspeople from Brooklyn
Grammy Award winners
Musicians from Brooklyn
Thomas Jefferson High School (Brooklyn) alumni
Writers from Brooklyn
Living people